Thomas Hales may refer to:

 Thomas Hales (c. 1515 – at least 1585), MP for Canterbury
 Sir Thomas Hales, 2nd Baronet (1666–1748), British Member of Parliament
 Sir Thomas Hales, 3rd Baronet (c. 1695–1762), British Member of Parliament and courtier
 Sir Thomas Hales, 4th Baronet (c. 1726–1773), British Member of Parliament
 Thomas Hales (dramatist) (c. 1740–1780), Anglo-French dramatist
 Thomas Callister Hales (born 1958), American mathematician
 Tom Hales (Irish republican) (1892–1966), Irish republican and politician
 Tom Hales (jockey) (1847–1901), Australian jockey

See also 
 Thomas Hale (disambiguation)